Luis Arroyo (19272016) was a Puerto Rican baseball pitcher.

Luis Arroyo may also refer to:

Luis Arroyo (politician) (born 1954), American politician and former member of Illinois House of Representatives
Luis Arroyo (Bolivian footballer) (born 1991), Bolivian football midfielder
Luis Arroyo (Ecuadorian footballer) (born 1996), Ecuadorian football forward
Luis Arroyo Chiques ( 2005–2017), Puerto Rican politician and former mayor of Aguas Buenas
Luis Arroyo Jr. (fl. 2015–present), American politician and commissioner, son of politician born 1954 with same name
Luis Arroyo (sociologist): Spanish sociologist and Political scientist.